Adam Zameenzad is the pseudonym for Saleem Ahmed, (14 March 1937 - 04 December 2017) A Pakistani-born British writer. The son of Fatima Aziz and Shammim Ahmad, he was born and educated in Pakistan and lived in Kenya, Canada and the USA before moving to Britain where he lived until his death in December 2017. 

His novels are; The Thirteenth House (winner of the 1987 David Higham Prize for Fiction), My Friend Matt and Hena the Whore, Love, Bones and Water, Cyrus Cyrus, Gorgeous White Female and Pepsi & Maria. 

Two of his novels (The Thirteenth House and Cyrus Cyrus) were longlisted for the Booker Prize.

Pepsi and Maria, a novel about the lives of street children, was published in 2004

Zameenzad was the first Pakistani English novelist to explore transgender issues with his tight, multilayered novel Gorgeous White Female, published in 1995.

References

Pakistani writers
1947 births
2017 deaths
British writers

External links
Adam Zameenzad's Official website
Adam Zameenzad's Agent